Berber Jews are the Jewish communities of the Maghreb, in North Africa, who historically spoke Berber languages.
Between 1950 and 1970 most immigrated to France, the United States, or Israel.

History

Antiquity
Jews have settled in Maghreb since at least the third century BC. According to one theory, which is based on the fourteenth-century writings of Arab philosopher Ibn Khaldun and was influential during the 20th century, Berbers adopted Judaism from these arrived Jews before the Arab conquest of North Africa. For example, French historian, Eugène Albertini dates the Judaization of certain Berber tribes and their expansion from Tripolitania to the Saharan oases, to the end of the 1st century. Marcel Simon for his part, sees the first point of contact between the western Berbers and Judaism in the great Jewish Rebellion of 66-70. Some historians believe, based on the writings of Ibn Khaldoun and other evidence, that some or all of the ancient Judaized Berber tribes later adopted Christianity and afterwards Islam, and it is not clear if they are a part of the ancestry of contemporary Berber-speaking Jews. According to Joseph Chetrit, recent research has shown weaknesses in the evidence supporting Ibn Khaldun's statement, and "seems to support scholars' hypothesis that Jews came to North Africa from ancient Israel after a stay in Egypt and scattered progressively from East to West, from the Middle East to the Atlantic in the Hellenic-Roman Empire".

Islamic period
Besides old settlements of Jews in the Atlas mountains and the interior Berber lands of Morocco, strong periodic persecutions by the Almohades most probably augmented the Jewish presence there. This hypothesis is reinforced by the pogroms which happened in Fes, Meknes and Taza in the late 15th century and which would have brought another wave of Jews, including amongst them Spanish Jewish-descended families such as the Peretz, and this wave would have even reached the Sahara with Figuig and Errachidia.

Some claim the female Berber military leader, Dihya, was a Berber Jew, though she is remembered in the oral tradition of some North-African communities as an oppressive leader for the Jews, and other sources claim her to be Christian. She is said to have aroused the Berbers in the Aures (Chaoui territory) in the eastern spurs of the Atlas Mountains in modern-day Algeria to a last, although fruitless, resistance to the Arab general Hasan ibn Nu'man.

After the Arab–Israeli War
Following the 1948 Arab–Israeli War, the tensions between the Jewish and Muslim communities increased. Jews in the Maghreb were compelled to leave due to these increased tensions. Today, the indigenous Berber Jewish community no longer exists in Morocco. The Moroccan Jewish population rests at about 2,200 persons with most residing in Casablanca, some of whom might still be Berber speakers.

Origin

In the past, it would have been very difficult to decide whether these Jewish Berber clans were originally of Israelite descent and had become assimilated with the Berbers in language and some cultural habits or whether they were indigenous Berbers who in the course of centuries had become Jewish through conversion by Jewish settlers. The second theory was developed mainly in the first half of the 20th century, as part of the quest of French colonial authorities to discover and emphasize pre-Islamic customs among the Berber-Muslim population since such customs and ways of life were believed to be more amenable and assimilable to French rule, legitimizing the policy that the Berbers would be governed by their own "customary" law rather than Islamic law.

Consequently, the main proponents of this theory were scholars such as Nahum Slouschz who worked closely with French authorities. Other scholars such as André Goldenberg and Simon Lévy also favoured it.

Franz Boas wrote in 1923 that a comparison of the Jews of North Africa with those of Western Europe and those of Russia "shows very clearly that in every single instance we have a marked assimilation between the Jews and the people among whom they live" and that "the Jews of North Africa are, in essential traits, North Africans".

Haim Hirshberg, a major historian of North African Jewry, questioned the theory of massive Judaization of the Berbers in an article named "The Problem of the Judaized Berbers". One of the points that Hirshberg raised in his article was that Ibn Khaldoun, the source of the Judaized Berbers theory, wrote only that few tribes "might" have been Judaized in ancient times and stated that in the Roman period the same tribes were Christianized.

The theory of a massive Judaization of the Berber population was further dismissed by a recent study on mtDNA (transmitted from mother to children). The study carried out by Behar et al. analysed small samples of North African Jews (Libya (83); Morocco (149); Tunisia (37)) indicates that Jews from North Africa lack typically North African Hg M1 and U6 mtDNAs. Hence, according to the authors, the lack of U6 and M1 haplogroups among the North Africans renders the possibility of significant admixture, as between the local Arab and Berber populations with Jews, unlikely. The genetic evidence shows them to be distinct from Berber populations, but more similar to Ashkenazi Jewish populations.

Notable people of Berber Jewish ancestry
 André Azoulay
 Audrey Azoulay
 Dunash ben Labrat
 Edmond Amran El Maleh
 Hélène Grimaud
 Salim Halali
 Enrico Macias
 Éric Zemmour

See also
 Judeo-Berber language
 Mizrahi Jews
 Maghrebi Jews
 North African Sephardim
 History of the Jews in Morocco
 History of the Jews in Algeria
 History of the Jews in Tunisia

References

External links
  Les Derniers Judeo-Berberes
 The Berbers and the Jews
 The Amazigh Jews
  La découverte des Juifs Berbères
 
 David Bensoussan, Il était une fois le Maroc : témoignages du passé judéo-marocain, éd. du Lys, www.editionsdulys.ca, Montréal, 2010; Deuxième édition :  www.iuniverse.com, 620p. ebook , Prix Haïm Zafrani de l'Institut universitaire Élie Wiesel, Paris 2012.

 
  
  
  
Jews
Jews and Judaism in Algeria
Jews and Judaism in Morocco
Jews and Judaism in Tunisia
Maghrebi Jews
Jewish ethnic groups